Francesco Andreini (1697–1751) was a Rococo era painter from Cesena, Italy. Two canvases by Andreini, depicting the Death of Nessus and the Rape (or abduction) of Europa, are displayed in the painting collection of the Circolo della Scranna, housed in the Palazzo Albicini in Forlì, Italy.

References

1697 births
1751 deaths
17th-century Italian painters
Italian male painters
18th-century Italian painters
18th-century Italian male artists